Shoot the Chute is an amusement ride consisting of a flat-bottomed boat that slides down a ramp or inside a flume into a lagoon. Unlike a log flume or super flume, which generally seats up to eight passengers, a modern-day Shoot the Chute ride generally has larger boats seating at least four across.

History

The first of this type of amusement ride was built by J.P. Newburg in 1884 down the side of a hill at Watchtower Park in Rock Island, Illinois. The ride traveled along a  greased wooden track, skipping across the Rock River at the bottom. It was then pulled back to the ramp by an onboard ride attendant. Newburg took this unique ride concept next to Chicago, where more flumes were built and the rides grew in popularity.

Paul Boyton opened Paul Boyton's Water Chute, America's first modern amusement park, at 63rd and Drexel in Chicago, Illinois, on July 4, 1894. Boyton's was the first amusement park to rely solely on mechanical attractions. Paul Boyton and Thomas Polk built another example in 1895 for Sea Lion Park at Coney Island. The ride was widely copied and "Chute" rides were found at many amusement parks throughout the United States, and even became the name of several amusement parks. While the original form of the ride is largely obsolete, modern log flume rides work on similar principles.

On the earliest chute rides, the flat-bottomed boat was pulled up the ramp by cable, sometimes with a turnaround on a small turntable. In the ride at Sea Lion Park, the passengers arrived at the top by elevator. The bottom of the ramp curved upwards, causing the boat to skip across the water until it came to a stop. The boat was guided to a landing by a boatman on board. The oldest ride of this type still in operation is the Boat Chute, constructed in 1926 and 1927 located at Lake Winnepesaukah Amusement Park in Rossville, Georgia near Chattanooga, Tennessee. An operating modern reproduction of the Luna Park shoot the chute ride of the early 20th century, The Pittsburg Plunge, is currently in operation at Kennywood amusement park in Pennsylvania.

Modern rides
The Shoot the Chute concept has evolved over time in the amusement park industry. All modern Shoot the Chute rides today feature a guide track after the descent down the chute into the pool of water that allows the boats to return to the loading platform—completing a closed-circuit track. Most modern Shoot the Chute rides usually consist of (though not limited to) an oval-shaped layout or a figure-eight layout. Many Shoot the Chute installations also have an observation platform or bridge so that spectators, in addition to riders, can get wet from the splash created by the boats.

Intamin took the Shoot the Chute concept to extremes with the opening of its first Mega Splash, Perilous Plunge at Knott's Berry Farm. At its opening, it was the tallest and steepest water flume ride in the world. Three seven-ton 24-passenger boats would climb a 121-foot (36.8 m) lift-hill, round a curve and descend a 115-foot (35 m) water chute at a 77.8-degree slope. Upon landing in the lagoon below, the boats created a 45-foot (13.7 m) high splash that drenched riders as well as spectators standing on an observation bridge overlooking the ride. The ride used an adjustable electromagnetic braking system to control the volume of the splash. A similar ride, Hydro, was later constructed at Oakwood Theme Park in Wales, UK. Perilous Plunge was removed from the park in 2012.

Schlitterbahn in Corpus Christi, Texas opened "Padre Plunge" in May 2017. This ride previously stood at Alabama Splash Adventure where it was known as "Buzzsaw Falls". It was damaged by Hurricane Harvey three months later and the ride permanently closed to the public. It demolished in March 2020. 

Holiday World & Splashin' Safari in Santa Claus, Indiana, built an even larger Shoot the Chute ride named Pilgrims Plunge. Pilgrims Plunge featured a 135-foot open elevator lift leading to a  drop at a 45' angle that would propel the boat to speeds approaching . Pilgrims Plunge opened for the 2009 season and was featured on a segment of the Travel Channel's Extreme series. It was renamed Giraffica for the 2013 season and removed in April 2014 due to downtime and reliability issues.

Notable manufacturers
 Arrow Dynamics
 Hopkins Rides
 Intamin
 WhiteWater West

Notes

References

External links

 Film of Shoot the Chute from the Library of Congress
 Another film of Shoot the Chute from the Library of Congress
 HD Remaster of Coney Island Chutes and Elephant Slide

Water rides
Amusement rides introduced in 1884